Avez Azmoudeh is a paralympic athlete from Iran competing mainly in category F54 javelin events.

Avaz competed in three Paralympics, first in 1992 in Barcelona where as well as competing in the THW4 discus he won a silver medal in the javelin.  Having missed the 1996 games he returned in 2000 where competing in only the F54 javelin he won the gold medal.  He made his third appearance in the 2004 Summer Paralympics where he again competed in just the javelin but could only manage bronze

References

External links
 

Paralympic athletes of Iran
Athletes (track and field) at the 1992 Summer Paralympics
Athletes (track and field) at the 2000 Summer Paralympics
Athletes (track and field) at the 2004 Summer Paralympics
Paralympic gold medalists for Iran
Paralympic silver medalists for Iran
Paralympic bronze medalists for Iran
Living people
Medalists at the 1992 Summer Paralympics
Medalists at the 2000 Summer Paralympics
Medalists at the 2004 Summer Paralympics
Year of birth missing (living people)
Paralympic medalists in athletics (track and field)
Iranian male javelin throwers
Wheelchair javelin throwers
Paralympic javelin throwers
21st-century Iranian people